Lock and Dam No. 25 is a lock and dam located near Winfield, Missouri, on the Upper Mississippi River around river mile 241.4. A  submersible dike extends to the Illinois shore. In 2004, the facility was listed in the National Register of Historic Places as Lock and Dam No. 25 Historic District, #04000184 covering , 2 buildings, 7 structures, 2 objects.

See also
 Public Works Administration dams list

References

External links
USGS Reach 2, Pool 25
Historic American Engineering Record documentation:

Dams completed in 1939
25
Transportation buildings and structures in Calhoun County, Illinois
Buildings and structures in Lincoln County, Missouri
Mississippi River locks
Dams in Missouri
Dams in Illinois
United States Army Corps of Engineers dams
Transport infrastructure completed in 1939
Roller dams
Gravity dams
Dams on the Mississippi River
Mississippi Valley Division
Historic American Engineering Record in Illinois
Historic American Engineering Record in Missouri
Historic districts on the National Register of Historic Places in Missouri
National Register of Historic Places in Lincoln County, Missouri
25
25
25
1939 establishments in Illinois
1939 establishments in Missouri